Krasny is a rural locality (a settlement) in Tishkovsky Selsoviet of Volodarsky District, Astrakhan Oblast, Russia. The population was 173 as of 2010. There is 1 street.

Geography 
Krasny is located 117 km south of Volodarsky (the district's administrative centre) by road. Tishkovo is the nearest rural locality.

References 

Rural localities in Volodarsky District, Astrakhan Oblast